Joseph-Clovis-Kemner Laflamme (September 19, 1849 – July 6, 1910) was a Canadian Roman Catholic priest, academic, and writer.

Born in Saint-Anselme, Lower Canada, the son of David Kemner dit Laflamme and Josephte Jamme, Laflamme received a Bachelor of Arts degree in 1868 from the Petit Séminaire de Québec. He was ordained a priest in 1872 and received a Doctor of Theology degree in 1873 from the Grand Séminaire de Québec. In 1870, he became an instructor in natural history at the Petit Séminaire. In 1875, he started teaching physics at the Université Laval and was appointed chair of mineralogy and geology in the faculty of arts. He also taught geology, mineralogy, and botany. In 1881, he published a textbook, Éléments de minéralogie et de géologie. From 1891 to 1909, he was dean of the faculty of arts.

He was president of the Royal Society of Canada from 1891 to 1892. He was a member of the Société géologique de France, the Société Française de Physique, the Société Scientifique de Bruxelles, and the Geological Society of America. In 1898, he was made a chevalier of the Légion d'honneur.

References
 

1849 births
1910 deaths
Canadian university and college faculty deans
19th-century Canadian Roman Catholic priests
People from Chaudière-Appalaches
Academic staff of Université Laval
Rectors of Université Laval
Chevaliers of the Légion d'honneur
Members of Société géologique de France
Fellows of the Royal Society of Canada